Anne Viriato (born 19 April 1997) is the first trans woman in the Brazilian MMA (Mixed Martial Arts).

Viriato continues to fight male opponents in the strawman class, competing in Mr Cage events. In 2018 she was awarded wins in Pitbull Fight Combat and Mr Cage Championship fights against men.

In June 2019, she was invited to give evidence in the public hearing to the Sports Committee in the Brazil Chamber of Deputies on the issue of transgender athletes.

References

External links 
 

Brazilian female mixed martial artists
1997 births
Living people
Transgender sportswomen
Brazilian LGBT sportspeople
LGBT mixed martial artists
21st-century Brazilian LGBT people